Jakarta Mori Tower (formerly tentatively known as the Jakarta Office Tower Project, or Jakarta MPP) is a skyscraper in Jakarta, Indonesia. It is located in the center of the Golden Triangle of Jakarta, next to Semanggi Interchange. 

The project is Mori Building’s first undertaking in Southeast Asia and its first major overseas undertaking since the Shanghai World Financial Center that opened in 2008.

See also
List of tallest buildings in Indonesia
List of tallest buildings in Jakarta

References

Towers in Indonesia
Buildings and structures in Jakarta
Skyscrapers in Indonesia
Post-independence architecture of Indonesia
Skyscraper office buildings in Indonesia